Birds of Tokyo is the debut four-track extended play from Australian alternative rockers, Birds of Tokyo, which was released in January 2005 on independent label, Egg Records, through MGM Distribution.

Background 

In 2004 Adam Spark, a Perth guitarist, approached local hard rockers, Karnivool's lead singer, Ian Kenny, to provide vocals for some demos he wanted to record for publication rights. They decided to start a side project, Birds of Tokyo, to record the material and recruited Anthony Jackson on bass guitar and Adam Weston on drums from fellow Perth group, Tragic Delicate. They released a self-titled four-track extended play as their debut in January 2005 on independent label Egg Records, which was distributed by MGM Distribution.

Track listing 

 "Russian Roulette" (Adam Spark, Ian Kenny) – 3:38 
 "Pedestal" (Spark, Kenny) – 4:40 
 "Believer" (Spark, Kenny) – 4:01 
 "Untitled" (Spark, Kenny) – 4:16

Footnotes

References 

2005 debut EPs
Birds of Tokyo albums